The 2022–23 FA Vase (Known for sponsorship reasons as the Isuzu FA Vase) is the 49th season of the FA Vase, an annual football competition for teams playing in levels 9 and 10 (steps 5 & 6) of the English National League System.

Calendar

First qualifying round
The draw for the first qualifying round was made on 8 July 2022.

Second qualifying round
The draw for the second qualifying round was also made on 8 July 2022.

First round proper
The draw for the First Round Proper was made on 26 September 2022.

Second round proper
The Second Round draw was made on 24 October 2022. The round contained the 103 winners from the previous round with an additional 25 teams who had received a bye until this stage of the competition.

Third round proper
The Third Round draw was made on 14 November 2022, consisting of the 64 winners from the previous round.

Fourth round proper
The draw for the Fourth Round was made on 5 December 2022.

Fifth Round Proper
The draw for the fifth Round Proper was made on 16 January 2023.

Quarter-finals
The draw for the quarter-finals was made on 13 February 2023.

Semi-finals
The four semi-finalists will play in a one-leg semifinal to determine the finalists for the FA Vase. The draw was made on Monday, March 13, 2023.

Final

References

FA Vase seasons
FA Vase